IRS is the United States Internal Revenue Service.  

IRS may also refer to:

Arts and entertainment
 I.R.S. Records
 "I.R.S.", a song by Guns N' Roses featured on their album Chinese Democracy
 Irwin R. Schyster, often abbreviated I.R.S., a ring name of professional wrestler Mike Rotunda
 IR$, a Franco-Belgian comics series telling the adventures of Larry Max, an IRS special agent

Economics
 Indian Revenue Service, of the Republic of India
 Interest rate swap

Organisations
 Independence Republic of Sardinia, an independentist political party in Sardinia, Italy
 Institute of Regional Studies
 Leibniz Institute for Research on Society and Space, a research institute in Germany and part of the Leibniz Association

Medicine
 Indoor residual spraying, the spraying of insecticide to kill the mosquitoes that spread malaria
 Insulin receptor substrate, a protein family involved in the insulin signaling pathway (insulin response)
 Intergroup Rhabdomyosarcoma Study Group, about the cancer, rhabdomyosarcoma
 Immune reconstitution syndrome, or Immune reconstitution inflammatory syndrome

Transportation
 Independent rear suspension, a form of independent suspension, used in automobiles
 Industrial Railway Society, a UK railway society
 International Railway Standard, standards produced by the International Union of Railways
 Inertial reference system, more commonly known as an inertial navigation system
 International Railway Systems, a Romanian freight railroad car producer
 IRS Airlines, an airline of Nigeria

Other uses
 International Rules Series, an international football competition between Australia and Ireland
 Indian Remote Sensing satellite
 Indian Readership Survey
 Information Retrieval System, in computer science
 Integrated reception system, for TV and radio signals
 Imperium Romanum Sacrum, the Latin name for the Holy Roman Empire
 Institutionalized Riot Systems